Emus may refer to:

 Emus, large flightless birds
 Emus (beetle), a genus of staphylinid beetle